Durand Township is a township in Beltrami County, Minnesota, United States. The population was 175 as of the 2000 census. Durand Township was named for Charles Durand, an early settler.

Geography

Unincorporated towns
 Puposky at 
(This list is based on USGS data and may include former settlements.)

Lakes
 Bass Lake (west half)
 Crane Lake (north quarter)
 George Lake (east quarter)
 Jackson Lake (west three-quarters)
 Little Puposky Lake (east edge)
 Lake Julia (northeast half)
 Long Slough Lake (west half)
 Peterson Lake
 Puposky Lake (east three-quarters)
 Strand Lake
 Swamp Lake
 Upper Lindgren Lake

Adjacent townships
 Nebish Township (north)
 Hagali Township (east)
 Turtle Lake Township (south)
 Liberty Township (southwest)
 Maple Ridge Township (west)

Demographics
As of the census of 2000, there were 175 people, 76 households, and 51 families residing in the township. The population density was 11.6 people per square mile (4.5/km2). There were 82 housing units at an average density of 5.4/sq mi (2.1/km2). The racial makeup of the township was 94.29% White, 5.14% Native American, and 0.57% from two or more races.

There were 76 households, out of which 26.3% had children under the age of 18 living with them, 56.6% were married couples living together, 10.5% had a female householder with no husband present, and 31.6% were non-families. 27.6% of all households were made up of individuals, and 6.6% had someone living alone who was 65 years of age or older. The average household size was 2.30 and the average family size was 2.81.

In the township the population was spread out, with 21.7% under the age of 18, 7.4% from 18 to 24, 22.9% from 25 to 44, 37.1% from 45 to 64, and 10.9% who were 65 years of age or older. The median age was 44 years. For every 100 females, there were 86.2 males. For every 100 females age 18 and over, there were 90.3 males.

The median income for a household in the township was $39,375, and the median income for a family was $43,438. Males had a median income of $32,500 versus $22,813 for females. The per capita income for the township was $22,886. None of the families and 7.3% of the population were living below the poverty line, including no under eighteens and 20.0% of those over 64.

References
 United States National Atlas
 United States Census Bureau 2007 TIGER/Line Shapefiles
 United States Board on Geographic Names (GNIS)

Townships in Beltrami County, Minnesota
Townships in Minnesota